Revolt at Fort Laramie is a 1957 American Color by Deluxe Western film directed by Lesley Selander and starring John Dehner, Gregg Palmer, Frances Helm and Don Gordon. The film was shot in Kanab, Utah with Harry Dean Stanton making his debut in the film.

Plot
In 1861, the undermanned garrison of Fort Laramie, Wyoming Territory was attempting to keep the peace with the Sioux Nation led by Chief Red Cloud. As part the Treaty with the Indians, The United States Government pays Red Cloud in gold to keep the peace and support his people. However Red Cloud comes up with the idea of stealing the gold and use the non payment as an excuse to go to war.

Meanwhile, as the United States face events that lead to the American Civil War, the garrison of the fort is split in their sympathies, a third of the men led by Sgt Darrach support the Confederate States of America whilst the rest led by Sgt Serrell support the Federal Union. When the garrison hears about the Battle of Fort Sumter, the Confederate faction not only wants to leave the army, but capture the fort and take the gold shipment due to be paid to Chief Red Cloud to Texas.

One of the Southerners warns Capt. Tenslip and Lt. Waller on the Southerner's plan to mutiny, for which he is murdered for betraying the cause with his screams covered by the men singing Dixie. Tenslip is worried that his commander, Major Bradner, a Virginian may side with the South. Meanwhile, Red Cloud sees the opportunity to split and wipe out the garrison as well as keeping the gold.

Cast
 John Dehner as Maj. Seth Bradner
 Gregg Palmer as Capt. James 'Jamie' Tenslip
 Frances Helm as Melissa Bradner
 Don Gordon as Jean Salignac
 Kenne Duncan as Capt. Foley
 Robert Knapp as 1st. Lt. Chick Waller
 Robert Keys as Sgt. Darrach 
 Bill Barker as Cpl. Hendrey
 Clay Randolph as Cpl. Caswell
 William 'Bill' Phillips as Serrell (as Wm. "Bill' Phillips)
 Sterling Franck as Ezra (as Cain Mason)
 Fritz Ford as Frederick Ford
 Eddie Little Sky as Red Cloud (as Eddie Little)
 Harry Dean Stanton as Rinty (uncredited)

Production
Parts of the film were shot at the Kanab movie fort and Kanab Creek in Utah.

Notable quotes
"The bitterest choice of all; to break your oath or your heart"—Major Seth Bradner

Soundtrack
Two well known and historical songs are included in the soundtrack of film:

 John Brown's Body
Lyrics: James E. Greenleaf, C. S. Hall, C. B. Marsh, and others, 1861 
Music: American folk song, 1856 
 Dixie
Lyrics and music: Daniel Decatur Emmett

See also
 List of American films of 1957

References

External links 
 
 
 

1957 films
1957 Western (genre) films
American Western (genre) films
American Civil War films
Films about Native Americans
Films directed by Lesley Selander
Films shot in Utah
United Artists films
Western (genre) cavalry films
1950s English-language films
1950s American films